Boeviyoulou Ménélik "Boevi" Lawson  (born 29 July 1963) is a former Togolese sprinter who competed in the men's 100m competition at the 1992 Summer Olympics. He recorded a 10.69, not enough to qualify for the next round past the heats. His personal best is 10.37, set in 1989. In the 1988 Summer Olympics, he scored a 10.59 in the 100m. In both 1992 and 1996, he additionally ran the 200m and was a part of the 4 × 100 m teams.

References

1963 births
Living people
Togolese male sprinters
Olympic athletes of Togo
Athletes (track and field) at the 1988 Summer Olympics
Athletes (track and field) at the 1992 Summer Olympics
Athletes (track and field) at the 1996 Summer Olympics
21st-century Togolese people